Happy Valley Athletic Association, known simply as Happy Valley or HVAA, is a Hong Kong football club which currently competes in the Hong Kong First Division. They are historically one of the most successful football clubs in Hong Kong, having won the First Division six times and had consistently been in the top division, until they were relegated to the Second Division after the 2009–10 season.

The club is part of a sports association which also operates swimming, basketball, first aid, table tennis, athletics and various other recreation activities under its umbrella.

History
Following the Second World War, the club was unofficially formed by five former schoolmates at Overseas Chinese University in Taichung, Taiwan. The schoolmates, Ng Kai Chi, Cheung Bing Fat, Cheung Bing Hung, Xie Gun Yang and Yip Wing Tim, frequently gathered at Ng's residence for meetings and were the club's founding fathers as well as players. Although not officially a club at the time, they organized pickup matches against other local teams.

1950s
Happy Valley formally registered with the Hong Kong Football Association in 1950 and in 1955 participated in the Chinese Amateur Athletic Federation of Hong Kong's summer football tournament, their first official competition.

During the 1957–58 season, the club were accepted into the Hong Kong Third A Division League. Success at the league level was immediate as the club won league titles in successive years, first winning the Third Division in 1957–58 and then winning the Second Division in 1958–59. Led by manager Chu Wing Keung, Happy Valley finished runners during their inaugural First Division campaign. The squad that season was notably young in age and featured future star Wong Man Wai.

1960s
In the aftermath of the 1967 Leftist riots, Happy Valley strongly opposed the HKFA's decision to issue a statement in support of the police. The club responded by withdrawing from the First Division in protest. They reentered the Hong Kong football league system a year later in 1968 through the Third Division with a three-year plan to return to the top flight. The club recruited new players such as Lo Tak Kuen, Chan Jong Deng, and former Hong Kong Rangers star Chung Cho Wai. The plan was successful and Happy Valley returned to the First Division in 1970.

1970s – 2000s
Happy Valley finished near the top of the table many times during this decade but were never able to finish as champions. In 1988–89, however, the club finally won the league for the first time since 1965.

With the success of Eastern and other company sponsored teams in the early '90s, Happy Valley were only able to achieve mid table finishes. By the middle of the decade, Eastern decided to rebuild with a young squad following their relegation and the company sponsored teams withdrew from the league. This allowed Happy Valley to enjoy their greatest run of success to date, winning four league titles, two Hong Kong FA Cups and three Senior Shields between 1997–2004. The team was led by notable players such as Cheung Sai Ho, Fan Chun Yip, Gerard, Lee Wai Man and Poon Yiu Cheuk.

At the conclusion of the 2008–09, chairman Pui Kwan Kay announced that Kwong Hiu Ming had been hired as Director of Football. His hiring led to a decision to restructure the football club, so as to reduce to the operational budget down to $3 million HKD. All players, with the exception of the three foreign players Ling Cong, Ciu Lin and Godfred Karikari were released and cheaper, younger players were signed.

In January 2010, several players boycotted training due to salary arrears. During the same year on 5 May, the ICAC arrested Ling Cong, Niu Jianlong, Wu Haopeng, Yu Yang and one other former player on suspicion of bribery and match fixing. Ling, Niu, and Wu were later released and all have claimed that they were not arrested, but rather, brought in for questioning in order to assist in the investigation. Yu Yang pleaded guilty to one count of offering an advantage to an agent and was sentenced to 10 months in jail. He was later banned for life by the HKFA following a Disciplinary Task Force meeting. The 60th anniversary of the club ended unceremoniously as the club finished at the bottom of the table, relegating them to the Second Division following a 40-year run in the top flight.

2010s
During the club's spell in the Second Division, they were able to retain important pieces such as keeper Cheung Wai Hong while signing Yuen Kin Man and Giorgi Kobakhidze. After a three-year absence, the club were promoted back to the First Division following a second-place finish in 2012–13.

On 5 January 2014, Happy Valley were once again at the centre of match fixing allegations as seven coaching staff and players were arrested by the ICAC following a big 5–0 loss to Sun Hei. Officials entered the team's dressing room at Tsing Yi Sports Ground immediately after the loss and took the seven members in for questioning on suspicion. Three days later, the HKFA postponed all of Happy Valley's for the next month pending the result of a hearing in which the club was to present to an Ad Hoc Committee that they were financially and operationally able to continue the remainder of the season. On 12 February 2014, the HKFA suspended Happy Valley for the duration of the First Division League season as well as expelling them from the FA Cup . The Eastern Court convicted player Saša Mus and deputy manager Hinson Leung of various crimes in connection to match fixing, sentencing Mus to 12 months of jail and fining Leung $4,000 HKD. The club were relegated following the year.

After a last place finish in 2015–16, the club were relegated to the bottom tier of Hong Kong football for the first time in 48 years.

Following successive relegations, it was decided that for the 2016–17 season, Happy Valley would loan players from Tung Sing and Chelsea Soccer School (HK). A U-18 academy team would also be restarted. The decisions proved to be very successful as Happy Valley lost only one league game all season en route to the Third Division title.

In the 2017–18 season, the club once again won the league title and were promoted back to the First Division.

Happy Valley won the First Division during the 2018–19 season. They applied for promotion to the Hong Kong Premier League at the conclusion of the season and were accepted on 17 June 2019.

2020s
After two seasons within the Hong Kong Premier League, Happy Valley confirmed that they will not participate in the 2021–22 HKPL season on 1 July 2021 due to financial difficulties.

Current squad

First team
{|class="wikitable"
|-
!Position
!Staff
|-
|Head coach||  Chill Chiu

 FP

Remarks:
LP These players are registered as local players in Hong Kong domestic football competitions.
FP These players are registered as foreign players.

Honours
Major trophies are listed below.

League
Hong Kong First Division (Tier 1)
Champions (6): 1964–65, 1988–89, 1998–99, 2000–01, 2002–03, 2005–06
Runners-up (16): 1959–60, 1960–61, 1961–62, 1963–64, 1965–66, 1974–75, 1977–78, 1978–79, 1979–80, 1981–82, 1985–86, 1987–88, 1990–91, 1999–00, 2001–02, 2004–05
Hong Kong Second Division/Hong Kong First Division (Tier 2)
Champions (3): 1958–59, 1969–70, 2018–19
Runners-up (1): 2012–13
Hong Kong Third Division/Hong Kong Second Division (Tier 3)
Champions (3): 1957–58, 1968–69, 2017–18
Hong Kong Third Division (Tier 4)
Champions (1): 2016–17

Cup competitions
Hong Kong Senior Shield
Champions (5): 1977–78, 1982–83, 1989–90, 1997–98, 2003–04
Runners-up (9): 1966–67, 1983–84, 1984–85, 1987–88, 1994–95, 1999–00, 2002–03, 2004–05, 2005–06
Hong Kong FA Cup
Champions (2): 1999–00, 2003–04
Runners-up (5): 1986–87, 1993–94, 2004–05, 2005–06, 2006–07
Hong Kong Sapling Cup
Runners-up (1): 2020–21
Hong Kong League Cup
Champions (1): 2000–01
Runners-up (5): 2002–03, 2003–04, 2004–05, 2005–06, 2006–07
 Hong Kong FA Cup Junior Division
Champions (1): 2018–19
Hong Kong Viceroy Cup
Champions (1): 1975–76
Runners-up (3): 1977–78, 1988–89, 1996–97

Continental record

Season-to-season record

Note:

Retired numbers

Head coaches

Club's mascot
The mascot of Happy Valley is a panda, as the fan club's captain wearing the number 12 jersey on the squad list.

References

External links
Happy Valley homepage 
Happy Valley at HKFA.com
Happy Valley's team page on the-AFC.com

 
Football clubs in Hong Kong
Hong Kong Premier League
Association football clubs established in 1950
1950 establishments in Hong Kong